The Battle of Wimpfen was a battle in the Palatinate campaign period of the Thirty Years' War on 6 May 1622 near Wimpfen.

The combined forces of the Catholic League and the Spanish Empire under Marshal Tilly and Gonzalo de Córdoba defeated the Protestant forces of Georg Friedrich, Margrave of Baden.

Background

Bohemian revolt 

In the Bohemian revolt phase of the Thirty Years' War, the Protestant Bohemian nobility refused to confirm Catholic Ferdinand II as their king and had offered Count Frederick V of the Palatinate the crown of Bohemia. Frederick was crowned in 1619 but lost the kingdom to Catholic League troops under General Tilly at the Battle of the White Mountain in 1620.

Due to disunity among Protestant princes the Protestant Union was forced to declare its neutrality in the conflict in the Treaty of Ulm in 1620 and dissolved the following year.

Palatinate campaign 

Count Georg Friedrich, Margrave of Baden had been one of the Protestant Union's generals and maintained the mercenary army he had raised.

When General Tilly moved the Catholic League army from Bavaria towards the Palatinate in April 1622 to continue the war against Frederick V, Georg Friedrich declared for Frederick's cause.
He marched his army to join General Mansfeld's troops and met with them a few days after their victory against Tilly at the Battle of Mingolsheim on April 27.

By early May, the forces of Christian of Brunswick had arrived to the north of the Neckar River and were prepared to assist their fellow Protestants. While Mansfeld crossed the Neckar at Heidelberg to join with Brunswick and besiege the Spanish garrison at Ladenburg, Georg Friedrich pursued Tilly's army who were retreating east towards the Neckar crossing at Wimpfen. Unknown to the Protestants, a Spanish army under General Córdoba had reinforced Tilly with several thousand men in the meantime.

Battle 

On May 6, both sides launched unsuccessful attacks on each other from early morning to about 11 o' clock.
Both sides had erected a wagenburg defense, fielded a strong artillery, and were cautious on the attack. Tilly held Córdobas troops in reserve at first, fearing an attack by one of the other Protestant armies in the area that wouldn't come. As the Catholic armies began to break, Tilly's elite regiments held their ground, forming into a tight pike formation and scaring away Georg Friedrich's cavalry regiments.

There was a lull in fighting until early afternoon when a Catholic assault on Georg-Friedrich's right flank sent his cavalry into flight. At about six o'clock an enemy cannon shot caused an explosion in the Protestant powder magazine, spreading panic in their ranks. Shortly afterwards, their wagenburg fell to Catholic attacks. Many died trying to escape across the Böllinger Bach creek.

Aftermath 

Count Georg Friedrich was injured in the face and narrowly escaped to Stuttgart, where he abdicated in favour of his eldest son. However, this did not save his family from punishment. His lands were thoroughly devastated by Catholic troops, and in August a substantial part of his domains was awarded to William, Margrave of Baden-Baden of a rival, Catholic branch of House Baden. Until 1771 the margraviate was split into Protestant Baden-Durlach and Catholic Baden-Baden.

General Tilly continued his campaign and prevailed again at the Battle of Höchst in June, then proceeded to subdue the fortified towns of the Electoral Palatinate one by one.

In 1623 the Diet of Regensburg awarded Frederick V's lands and seat in the Electoral College to Duke Maximilian of Bavaria, an eminent leader of the Catholic League. From 1623 he styled himself Maximilian I, Elector of Bavaria and his duchy Electorate of Bavaria.

References 

1622 in Europe
Conflicts in 1622
Battles involving the Holy Roman Empire
Battles involving Spain
Battles of the Thirty Years' War
Margraviate of Baden
1622 in the Holy Roman Empire
Battles in Baden-Württemberg